Castiglione Olona is a town and comune in the province of Varese, in Lombardy. As of 31 December 2015, it has a population of 7,753 inhabitants.

History
The town of Castiglione Olona rose around the fifth century CE under the Roman Empire domain. Consequently, the Lombards entered and took possession of the village until the Castiglioni family became sole proprietor of the land around 1000 AC. The family engaged in many battles for the rule of the lands so they had walls built all around the village to protect themselves from enemies. Today only a small part of the walls near the fortress is visitable. In 1422, cardinal Branda da Castiglione obtained the permission from Pope Martin V to build the church of Collegiata (Santi Stefano e Lorenzo); the church contains frescoes attributed to Masolino.

In the town, the 15th and 16th century palace of cardinal Branda now serves as a museum, still contains a chapel and a number of frescoed walls, some attributed to Sienese painter Vecchietta.

Twin towns — sister cities
Castiglione Olona is twinned with:

  Étupes, France

References

Cities and towns in Lombardy